Colley is a surname of Irish and English origin. In Ireland, Colley is an anglicized form of the Gaelic Cú Uladh meaning the "Hound of Ulster". Alternatively, originating in Yorkshire, the name contained the root 'Col' derived from cole. Colley is also of Gambian origin.

Notable people with the surname include:

Angela Colley (born 1964), Gambian politician
Anne Colley (born 1951), Irish politician
David Colley (born 1947), Australian cricketer
Ebrima Colley (born 2000), Gambian footballer
George Colley (1925–1983), Irish politician
George Pomeroy Colley (1835–1881), British General
Harold John Colley (1895–1918), British soldier
Henry Colley (disambiguation), multiple people
John Edward Colley (born 1948), original name of John Ford Coley, American pianist
Kenneth Colley (born 1937), British actor
Kevin Colley (born 1979), American ice hockey player
Linda Colley (born 1949), British historian
Mariama Colley (born 1988), Gambian actress
Michael Colley (1938–2013), American vice-admiral
Omar Colley (born 1992), Gambian footballer
Randy Colley (1950–2019), wrestler
Richard Colley (disambiguation), multiple people
Robert Colley (born 1954), New Zealand boxer
Russell Colley (1897–1996), engineer, early spacesuit creator
Samantha Colley (born 1987), British actress
Samuel Colley (1807–1890), American politician
Sarah Ophelia Colley Cannon or Minnie Pearl (1912–1996), American country comedian
Saruba Colley (born 1989), Gambian sprinter
Scott Colley (born 1963), jazz bassist
Susan Jane Colley (born 1959), American mathematician
Thomas Colley, 18th century Sellack, Herefordshire gentry 
William Dixon Colley (1913–2001), Gambian journalist

See also
Coles (surname)
Coley (surname)
Colle (disambiguation)
Colles (disambiguation)
Collie (disambiguation) (includes many people called Collie or Colly)
Cowley (surname)

de:Colley